The Great Northern Railway M-1 was a class of 35 American 2-6-8-0 locomotives introduced  in 1910. A total of 35 of these Mallet locomotives were built by Baldwin Locomotive Works in two batches; the first 10 in December 1909, followed by a further 25 in June to August 1910. They were early articulateds and worked their entire life on the Great Northern Railway (GN). These engines were unusual because of having two uneven sets of driving wheels; the front set having six driving wheels, and the rear set having eight driving wheels.

All M-1's were converted to be simple-expansion cylinders from 1926 to 1927 and reclassified M-2. Twenty-two of the M-2's were dismantled between 1929 and 1931, with parts being recycled into new class O-7 Mikados numbered  3376-3396 in 1930 . Three O7 Mikado’s were rebuilt to O8 Mikados numbered 3397-3399 in 1932 . The 13 M-2's not rebuilt lasted until the dieselisation era, and were sold for scrap between 1949 and 1954. No M-1's have survived into preservation. None of the O-8's that were rebuilt from the O-7's that were once part of the M-1's were preserved either.

Images
  as M-1.
  as rebuilt to M-2.

References

M-1
Railway locomotives introduced in 1910
Scrapped locomotives
2-6-8-0 locomotives
Baldwin locomotives